Aleksandr Aleksandrovich Tsybikov (born 17 January 1994) is a Russian football defender.

Club career
He made his debut in the Russian Football National League for FC Torpedo Moscow on 22 April 2013 in a game against FC Salyut Belgorod.

References

External links
 
 

1994 births
Footballers from Moscow
Living people
Russian footballers
Association football defenders
FC Torpedo Moscow players
FC Krymteplytsia Molodizhne players
FC Zvezda Perm players
FC Volga Ulyanovsk players